The IIFA Award for Best Supporting Actor recognizes a male actor who has delivered an outstanding performance in a supporting role. The award is chosen by the viewers and the winner is announced at the ceremony. Saif Ali Khan, Arjun Rampal, Anil Kapoor and Abhishek Bachchan are leading with 2 wins.

Superlatives

List of winners
† - indicates the performance also won the Filmfare Award‡ - indicates the performance was also nominated for the Filmfare Award

2000s

 2000 Anil Kapoor – Taal as Vikrant Kapoor †
 2001 Amitabh Bachchan – Mohabbatein as Narayan Shankar †
 Anupam Kher – Kya Kehna as Gulshan Baxi
 Chandrachur Singh – Josh as Rahul
 Paresh Rawal – Har Dil Jo Pyar Karega as Goverdhan
 Sunil Shetty – Refugee as Ranger Mohammad Ashraf ‡ 
 2002 Saif Ali Khan – Dil Chahta Hai as Sameer
 Akshaye Khanna – Dil Chahta Hai as Siddharth Sinha †  
 Amitabh Bachchan – Kabhi Khushi Kabhie Gham... as Yashvardhan Raichand ‡ 
 Hrithik Roshan – Kabhi Khushi Kabhie Gham... as Rohan Raichand ‡
 Kulbhushan Kharbanda – Lagaan: Once Upon a Time in India as Rajah Puran Singh
 2003 Mohanlal – Company as Srinivasan ‡
 Ashutosh Rana – Raaz as Agni Swaroop
 Dilip Prabhavalkar – Encounter: The Killing as Ponappa Awadhe
 Jackie Shroff – Devdas as Chunnilal ‡
 Sushant Singh – The Legend of Bhagat Singh as Sukhdev
 2004 Saif Ali Khan – Kal Ho Naa Ho as Rohit Patel †
 Arshad Warsi – Munna Bhai M.B.B.S. as Sarkeshwar (Circuit) ‡
 Ashutosh Rana – LOC Kargil as Yogender Singh, 18 Grenadiers
 Sunil Shetty – Qayamat: City Under Threat as Akram Sheikh
 Yash Tonk – Janasheen as Max Pereira
 2005 Abhishek Bachchan – Yuva as Lallan Singh †
 Amitabh Bachchan – Veer-Zaara as Choudhary Sumer Singh‡  
 Pankaj Kapur – Maqbool as Jahangir Khan (Abbaji)
 Paresh Rawal – Aitraaz as Advocate Patel
 Zayed Khan – Main Hoon Na as Lakshman Prasad Sharma a.k.a. Lucky ‡
 2006 Abhishek Bachchan – Sarkar as Shankar Nagre †
 Amitabh Bachchan – Bunty Aur Babli as Dashrath Singh ‡ 
 John Abraham – Garam Masala as Shyam "Sam"
 Naseeruddin Shah – Iqbal as Mohit ‡
 Sanjay Dutt – Parineeta as Girish ‡
 2007 Arshad Warsi – Lage Raho Munna Bhai as Circuit (Sarkeshwar)
 Amitabh Bachchan – Kabhi Alvida Naa Kehna as Samarjit 'Sam' Talwar ‡ 
 Abhishek Bachchan – Kabhi Alvida Naa Kehna as Rishi Talwar † 
 Atul Kulkarni – Rang De Basanti as Laxman Pandey / Ramprasad Bismil
 Kunal Kapoor – Rang De Basanti as Aslam / Ashfaqullah Khan ‡ 
 2008 Irrfan Khan – Life in a... Metro as Monty †
 Anil Kapoor – Welcome as Sagar Pandey (Majnu) ‡
 Govinda – Partner as Bhaskar Devkar Chaudhary
 Mithun Chakraborty – Guru as Manik Dasgupta ‡
 Rajat Kapoor – Bheja Fry as Ranjeet Thadani
 2009 Arjun Rampal – Rock On!! as Joe Mascarenhas †
 Abhishek Bachchan – Sarkar Raj as Shankar Nagare ‡
 Irrfan Khan – Mumbai Meri Jaan as Thomas
 Sonu Sood – Jodhaa Akbar as Rajkumar Sujamal ‡
 Vinay Pathak – Rab Ne Bana Di Jodi as Balwinder "Bobby" Khosla ‡

2010s
 2010 Sharman Joshi – 3 Idiots as Raju Rastogi ‡
 Abhimanyu Singh – Gulaal as Rananjay Singh "Ransa"
 Abhishek Bachchan – Paa as Amol Arte
 Irrfan Khan – New York as Roshan
 R. Madhavan – 3 Idiots as Farhan Qureshi ‡
 Rishi Kapoor – Love Aaj Kal as Veer Singh
 2011 Arjun Rampal – Raajneeti as Prithviraj Pratap ‡ 
 Arshad Warsi – Ishqiya as Razzak Hussain ‡ 
 Emraan Hashmi – Once Upon a Time in Mumbaai as Shoaib Khan ‡
 Manoj Bajpayee – Raajneeti as Virendra Pratap ‡
 Mithun Chakraborty – Golmaal 3 as Pritam 
 2012 Farhan Akhtar – Zindagi Na Milegi Dobara as Imran †
 Abhay Deol – Zindagi Na Milegi Dobara as Kabir ‡
 Emraan Hashmi – The Dirty Picture as Abraham
 Naseeruddin Shah – The Dirty Picture as Suryakant ‡
 Randeep Hooda – Saheb, Biwi Aur Gangster as Lalit/Babloo
 2013 Annu Kapoor – Vicky Donor as Dr. Baldev Chaddha †
 Akshay Kumar – OMG – Oh My God! as Krishna Vasudev Yadav ‡
 Mithun Chakraborty – OMG – Oh My God! as Leeladhar Swamy
 Nawazuddin Siddiqui – Gangs of Wasseypur – Part 1 as Faizal Khan
 Nawazuddin Siddiqui – Talaash: The Answer Lies Within as Taimur ‡
 Saurabh Shukla – Barfi! as Sudhanshu Dutta
 2014 Aditya Roy Kapur – Yeh Jawaani Hai Deewani as Avinash "Avi" Arora ‡ 
 Anupam Kher – Special 26 as P.K. Sharma ‡
 Nawazuddin Siddiqui – The Lunchbox as Shaikh †
 Pawan Malhotra – Bhaag Milkha Bhaag as Hawaldar (Constable) Gurudev Singh
 Saurabh Shukla – Jolly LLB as Justice Tripathi
 2015 Riteish Deshmukh – Ek Villain as Rakesh Mahadkar ‡
 Inaamulhaq – Filmistaan as Aftab
 Kay Kay Menon – Haider as Khurram Meer † 
 Naseeruddin Shah - Finding Fanny as Ferdinand "Ferdie" Pinto
 Randeep Hooda – Kick as Himanshu Tyagi
 Ronit Roy – 2 States as Vikram Malhotra (Krish's father) ‡ 
 2016 Anil Kapoor - Dil Dhadakne Do as Kamal Mehra † 
 Deepak Dobriyal – Tanu Weds Manu Returns as Pappi ‡
 Farhan Akhtar – Dil Dhadakne Do as Sunny Gill
 Irrfan Khan – Piku as Rana Chaudhary
 Nawazuddin Siddiqui - Bajrangi Bhaijaan as Chand Nawab
 2017 Anupam Kher - M.S. Dhoni: The Untold Story as Pan Singh
 Amitabh Bachchan - Wazir as Pandit Omkar Nath Dar
 Rajat Kapoor - Kapoor & Sons as Harsh Kapoor ‡
 Rajkummar Rao - Aligarh as Deepu Sebastian ‡
 Rishi Kapoor - Kapoor & Sons as Amarjeet Kapoor †
 2018 Nawazuddin Siddiqui - Mom as Daya Shankar "DK" Kapoor ‡
Deepak Dobriyal - Hindi Medium as Shyamprakash Kori ‡
Pankaj Tripathi - Newton as Assistant Commandant Aatma Singh ‡
Rajkummar Rao - Bareilly Ki Barfi as Pritam Vidrohi †
Vijay Maurya - Tumhari Sulu as Pankaj Rai Baaghi
2019 Vicky Kaushal - Sanju as Kamlesh Kanhaiyalal Kapasi †
Anil Kapoor - Race 3 as Shamsher Singh
Jim Sarbh - Padmaavat as Malik Kafur ‡
Manoj Pahwa - Mulk as Bilaal Ali Mohammed ‡
Pankaj Tripathi - Stree as Rudra ‡

2020s 

 2022 Pankaj Tripathi – Ludo as Satyendra "Sattu Bhaiya" Tripathi
 Jiiva – 83 as Krishnamachari Srikkanth
 Kumud Mishra – Thappad as Sachin Sandhu
 Pankaj Tripathi – 83 as PR Man Singh
 Saif Ali Khan – Tanhaji as Udaybhan Singh Rathore

See also 
 IIFA Awards
 Bollywood
 Cinema of India

References

External links
 2007 Awards

International Indian Film Academy Awards